Roberto Cortés may refer to:

 Roberto Carlos Cortés (born 1977), Colombian football defender
 Roberto Cortés (Chilean footballer) (1902–1975), Chilean football goalkeeper